Sande Zeig is an American film director and writer. She was the partner of late French feminist writer Monique Wittig. She directed the 2000 romantic drama The Girl.

Biography
Sande Zeig is from New York City and is of Jewish heritage. She studied theater in Wisconsin and Paris. In 1975, Zeig was living in Paris, studying mime and teaching karate, when she met the writer Monique Wittig. Zeig's 2000 film, The Girl is based on a short story by Wittig. Her 2008 biographical film Soul Masters: Dr. Guo and Dr. Sha follows the work of two Chinese healers, one of whom had previously treated Zeig's father. Zeig is the founder of New York City film distribution company Artistic License Films.

Filmography
Central Park (1994)
The Girl (2000)
Soul Masters: Dr. Guo and Dr. Sha (2008)
Apache 8 (2011)
Sister Jaguar's Journey (2015)

Bibliography
Lesbian Peoples: Material for a Dictionary (Brouillon pour un dictionnaire des amantes) — coauthored with Monique Wittig

See also
 List of female film and television directors
 List of lesbian filmmakers
 List of LGBT-related films directed by women

References

External links

 Sande Zeig's film Apache 8 at Women Make Movies

American film directors
Jewish feminists
Lesbian feminists
LGBT film directors
Lesbian Jews
American lesbian writers
Living people
Year of birth missing (living people)
American women film directors
LGBT people from New York (state)
Writers from New York (state)
21st-century American essayists
21st-century American journalists
20th-century American women writers
21st-century American women writers
American women essayists
20th-century American non-fiction writers